Iława is a town in northern Poland with 32,276 inhabitants (2010).  It is situated in the Warmian-Masurian Voivodeship (since 1999); previously it was in Olsztyn Voivodeship (1975–1998). It is the capital of Iława County.

The town is located in the Iławskie Lake District, on the longest lake in Poland - Jeziorak. It is located in the area of historical Pomesania in the area defined as Upper Prussia (Oberland) since the 16th century. The rivers Iławka and Tynwałd flow through Iława. Within the city's administrative area there is the largest inland island in Poland - Wielka Żuława, which has a permanent ferry connection with the city. The city is located in the area of the Green Lungs of Poland - an area characterized by clean air and diversity of the natural system. From the west and north, Iława is surrounded by the Iława Lake District Landscape Park. Iława is a holiday, paralympic and tourist resort. In the forest just outside Iława there are two Polish Television holiday resorts (Sarnówek and Tłokowisko) to which journalists come for a holiday. From Iława you can reach the Baltic Sea through Jeziorak Lake and the historic, unique in the world Elbląg Canal.

Before World War II, the town was called "The Pearl of Oberland";. At Lake Silm, one of the world's several training centres for skippers and port pilots, they learn to manoeuvre seagoing ships on miniaturised models. The city is called the summer capital of traditional jazz because of the oldest festival of this music genre in Europe - Old Jazz Meeting "Złota Tarka";. In Iława there is the Pope's Calvary of the Iława Lake District, whose canoe-shaped Stations of the Cross refer to and commemorate Karol Wojtyła's two visits to Jeziorak, after which the future Pope was kayaking with young people. Iława lies on the Road of St. James (one of the most important Christian pilgrimage routes in the world) which leads to the Cathedral of Santiago de Compostella in Spain.

Natural conditions 
According to the data of January 1, 2009, the area of the city is 21. 88 km², placing the city on the third position in the province. The town is also the fifth largest in the Warmia and Mazury region and the fifth in the population.

Iława and its surroundings lie on undulating moraine and sandstone areas, distinguished by varied forms of sculpture. Within the city, on Lake Jeziorak (the longest lake in Poland and the sixth largest) is the island of Wielka Żuława with relics of an Old Prussian town. In the vicinity of the city, in the sand terrain, there are lakes, mainly gutter lakes, surrounded by significant forest complexes. In Iława itself, apart from the mentioned Jeziorak, there are a dozen or so smaller lakes (i.e. Little Jeziorak, Iławskie, Dół). The lakes and rivers of the Iławskie Lake land form, together with the Elbląg Canal, a wide system of inland navigation, connecting the surrounding water bodies. This channel makes it possible to reach the Baltic Sea from Iława.

History 

The city existed originally as an Old Prussian settlement and was recorded by Teutonic Knights in Prussia in 1305. It is documented in a manuscript by Luther von Braunschweig in 1317 and its first names are known as Ylavia, Ylaw, and Ilow. It was located on the Eylenz (Iławka) River between Lakes Geserich (Jeziorak) and Eylenz (Iławskie). The town was under the jurisdiction of the komtur of Christburg (Dzierzgoń) and since 1340 under Osterode (Ostróda).

At the start of the Thirteen Years’ War (1454–1466) in February 1454, Iława sided with the Prussian Confederation, at the request of which King Casimir IV Jagiellon signed the act of incorporation of the region to Poland. In April 1454 the town pledged allegiance to the Polish King. After Poland's loss at the Battle of Chojnice, in November 1454 it was taken over by the Teutonic Knights, who handed over its defence to Czech mercenaries. In 1457, the unpaid Czech mercenaries sold the town to Poland. After the peace treaty signed in Toruń in 1466 the town came under Polish suzerainty as a fief. In 1520 Polish King Sigismund I the Old granted Iława the right to collect tolls on the bridge over Jeziorak.

In 1525 the town became part of the Duchy of Prussia, a vassal state of the Polish Crown, and in 1701 it became part of the Kingdom of Prussia. Administered within the new province of West Prussia in 1773, it became part of the German Empire in 1871. During the Seven Years' War, the town was occupied by Russia between 1758 and 1762.

In 1862 the Elbląg Canal was built between Elbing (Elbląg) and Eylau by engineer Georg Steenke, which enabled the inland town to transport bulk of lumber, farm products, and other goods north to Elbing and the Baltic Sea. This was superseded ten years later by rail transport, when the Thorn (Toruń)-Insterburg (Chernyakhovsk) railway line was constructed.

20th century

According to the German census of 1910, the town had a population of 10,087, of which 9,566 (94.8%) were Germans and 380 (3.8%) were Poles. After Poland regained its independence in 1918, the East Prussian plebiscite of 1920 allowed the residents to cast votes either in favor of remaining in Germany or becoming a part of Poland. The vote took place amid persecution of Polish activists by the German side. Ultimately the town voted to remain in Germany by 4,746 to 235 votes. It became part of Regierungsbezirk West Prussia in the Province of East Prussia.

Towards the end of the World War II, most population left the town, and the Soviet Army destroyed approximately 85% of the town. After World War II, Soviet pressure at the Potsdam Conference led to Iława's inclusion in the Polish territory. The historic Polish name Iława was adopted to replace the Germanized name.

Toponyms 
The name Iława is thought to originate from the ancient Prussian word ilis, meaning black. The related Baltic-Slavic word ilo or ilu means the black colour but also mud. The name might refer to the swampy area where the city lies, or to the dark water of the lake Jeziorak.

The oldest written form of the name Iława is Latin Ylavia. This form appeared on a location document from 1317. Later documents of 1333 and 1334 mention Ylav, while the variety Ylau is mentioned in 1338. In the fifteenth century, the form Ylow and Ylow Thethonicalis appeared. In the years 1430 and 1438, the documents issued by the Dzierzgon command post spoke of Deutschen Ylaw. In the years 1443, 1457 and 1458 the town was named Ylau, and in 1456 it took the form of Ilau, then in 1459 it was changed to Eylaw. The name Deutze Eylau is used in 1457 and its other form Dwetsch Eylau in 1468. Between the 16th and 17th centuries, the names Teutschen Eylau, Deutscheneylau and Theuto Ilavia appear. In the 18th century, the Deutsch Eylau form was adopted, valid until 1933. On 1 January 1934 the name was changed to Stadt Deutsch Eylau (Stadt - en. The town), and since 1945 the Polish name of the town is Iława, which was officially approved on 7 May 1946.

Symbols of the town 

On the coat of arms of Iława there is the figure of the Mother of God with the Child in her arms, who sits on the throne at the city gate. The coat of arms of Iława was amended by the resolution of the City Council of May 28, 1998.

Iława's city bugle-call was approved by the resolution of the City Council of August 29, 1996. It is played every day at 12.00 on the trumpet from the town hall tower. It was composed in 1995 by Henryk Majewski - a well-known jazz musician, one of the organizers of the Złota Tarka festival held annually in Iława.

The flag of Iława was approved by a resolution of the City Council of April 24, 1997. It depicts the coat of arms of Iława and ten alternately arranged wavy stripes in white and blue, which symbolize waves of Jeziorak lake.

Neighbourhoods in Iława 

 Stare Miasto
 Centrum
 Ostródzkie
 Piastowskie
 Młodych
 Kormoran
 Lipowy Dwór
 Gajerek
 Podleśne
 XXX-lecia
 Dzielnica Przemysłowa
 Lubawskie
 Kopernika
 Nowy Świat
 Słoneczne
 Marina Iława
 Wojska Polskiego
 Sobieskiego

Demography 
Data as of 30 June 2009:

According to the data of 30 June 2008 the city had 33 775 inhabitants.

Economy and industry 
In Iława County there is the second lowest unemployment rate in Warmińsko-Mazurskie Voivodeship (5. 8%) just after Olsztyn County (5. 1%) - data as of the end of August 2016. Iława is a subzone of the Warmia and Mazury Special Economic Zone.

Culture

Cultural life 
The town holiday is June 11, commemorating the location of Ilawa in 1305. Most of the cultural events in the city are under the patronage of the Iława Culture Centre. At the ICK there is the "Pasja"; cinema, where DKF "Kadr"; operates. There is the Municipal Public Library in Iława, as well as the District Pedagogical Library, which is a part of the District Centre for Education Development in Iława, and a branch of the Warmia and Mazury Pedagogical Library of Iława. The Karol Wojtyła Foundation in Elbląg. There are several art galleries in the city.

Festivals 

 Open Air MayDay Lead Festival 
 International Traditional Jazz Festival "Złota Tarka"; (oldest traditional jazz festival in Europe) 
 Summer Theatrical Impressions 
 Jeziorak Szanty
 International Festival of Classical Music "Viva Musica"
 Fama Rock Festival
 Hip-hop and rap music festival - Park Jam
 Soundlake Festival

Museums 

 Sailing Memorial Chamber
 Museum of Automation and Military Affairs
 Museum of Graphic Arts "Mon petit Louvre";

Local media

Local press 

 Kurier Iławski (weekly)
 Gazeta Iławska, weekly supplement to Gazeta Olsztyńska (weekly)
 Life of the Region (weekly)
 Panorama of the Region (monthly)
 Iławski Poviat - Regional monthly magazine
 Charming - a newspaper for children and young people published by the Iława Lakeland and Dylewskie Hills Landscape Parks Complex, published three times a year

Television 

 Iława internet television ilawatv.pl

Radio 

 Radio Eska Iława
 Meloradio

Local websites 

 ilawa.pl
 ilawa.wm.pl
 powiatilawski.pl
 ilawa.naszemiasto.pl
 infoilawa.pl
 ilawa.dlawas.info

Iława in culture 
In 1974, the film Gniazdo directed by Jan Rybkowski was recorded on Wielka Żuława Island, telling the story of the first years of the Polish state. The action of two adventures of "Pan Samochodzik"; - Nowe przygody Pana Samochodzika and Pan Samochodzik i złota rękawica by Zbigniew Nienacki - took place in Iława and at Jeziorak. In November 1995. Volker Schlöndorff (author of, "Blaszany bębenek";) shot scenes for his film King Olch with John Malkovich in the ruins of Szymbark Castle (8 km from Iława). In 1989, TVP recorded a documentary film Bloody Ilawa about the Ilawa prison famous for its rebellion, pacification and self-mutilation, as well as for the beating of the interned in spring 1982.

Jewish cemetery
The Jewish cemetery in Iława was established shortly after 1812 and covered an area of 0. 44 hectare. It was devastated by the Nazis and then liquidated by the communist authorities between 1975 and 1976. The land and the remains of the people buried there were used to renovate the IKS Jeziorak stadium. Currently in its place there is an IKS Jeziorak training pitch.

Sports
Iława is a centre of water sports. The city has many marinas, water equipment and bicycle rentals. The town has a sports stadium, a sportsand entertainment hall, a sports swimming pool (Sports and Recreation Centre), a bowling alley, a Pump track extreme cycling track, a skatepark, an indoor ice rink, a traffic town, 2 guarded beaches, 3 Orlik pitches, a motocross-bike and bicycle track, a forest shootingrange, a rowing track, a mini-golf course, and several gyms. On November 18, 1992 at the Municipal Stadium in Iława a friendly football match between Poland and Latvia took place.

The Iława Sports Centre for Tourism and Recreation operates in Iława, which supports various sports sections. In the city there is a sports club Jeziorak Iława, consisting of several sections, among others football, handball, table tennis and taekwondo. Moreover, there are local clubs, institutions andassociations in Iława which bring together people who practice, amongothers martial arts, rowing, volleyball, tennis, athletics, swimming, shooting and cycling.

There is a troop of the Polish Scouting Association in Iława. There aretwo multi-level teams, three teams of hikers (16–21 years old), oneteam of older scouts (13–16 years old), four teams of scouts (19-13years old) and four teams of chefs.

Touristic trails

Walk trails 

 Yellow Trail (28. 3 km): from Iława to Samborow along Lake Jeziorak 
 Blue Trail (26 km): from Iława through Sarnówek to Siemiany along Jeziorak Lake 
 Green Trail (41. 3 km): from Iława to Kamieniec 
 The Forest Teaching Trail "Jasne"; 
 "Silm"; Forest Teaching Trail

Bike trails 

 Trail red (about 60 km): from Iława north east to Jezierzice and west to Kisielice 
 Trail blue (about 60 km): from Iława to Zalewo along Gil Mały, Gil Wielki and Jeziorak lakes 
 Trail green (about 137 km): from Iława to Elbląg along the Elbląg Canal 
 Yellow trail (about 131 km): from Gorzno to Elbląg along the Elbląg Canal

Kayak trails 

 The Sir Charles Canoeing Trail. John Paul II - Ostróda - Miłomłyn - Siemiany - Gizerek - IŁAWA
 The Old Apple Canoeing Trail - Miłomłyn - IŁAWA (length. 63,4 km) - Stare Jabłonki - J. Szeląg M. - J. Szeląg W. - J. Pauzeńskie - Ostróda - J. Drwęckie - K. Elbląski - Miłomłyn - K. Iławski - J.Jeziorak - Chmielówka - Makowo - Szałkowo - IŁAWA 
 Kayak Trail IŁAWA - Stare Jabłonki (length: 1. 5 km) (73,3 km) -IŁAWA - Iławka - Drwęca - J. Drwęckie - Ostróda - J. Pauzeńskie - J.Szeląg W. i M. - S. Jabłonki 
 Canoe trail IŁAWA - IŁAWA (length. 136. 7 km) - Reich. Iławka - Rz. Drwęca - J. Drwęckie - Ostróda - J. Szeląg Wielki - J. Szeląg M. - Stare
 Jabłonki - K. Elbląski - Miłomłyn - K. Iławski - J. Dauby - J. Jeziorak - IŁAWA

Sail trails 

 Trail of Iława and Elbląg canal - IŁAWA - Makowo - Zatoka Kraga - Lake Dauby - Lake Karnickie - Miłomłyn - K. Elbląski - J. Drwęckie
 Trail of Jeziorak and Płaskie Lake - IŁAWA - Siemiany - Jerzwałd 
 Trail of Lake Jeziorak and Ewingi - IŁAWA - Siemiany - Matyty - Dobrzyki - Zalewo 
 Trail of Iława and Elbląg canal - IŁAWA - Makowo - Zat. Kraga - K.Iławski - Miłomłyn - K. Elbląski

Notable residents
 Richard Altmann (1852–1900), pathologist
 Karl Heinemann (1857 – 1927) a German literary historian and philologist.
 Erich Diestel (1892–1973), Wehrmacht general 
 Friedrich Karst (1893–1975), general
 Gustav Wilke (1898–1977), Fallschirmjäger general
 Helmuth Stieff (1901–1944), Wehrmacht general and resistance fighter
 Joachim Meichssner (1906–1944), Wehrmacht officer and resistance fighter
 Paul Semrau (1915–1945), Luftwaffe pilot
 Mirosław Kochalski (born 1965) was the Mayor of Warsaw
 Jarosław Kotewicz (born 1969) a retired Polish high jumper

Gallery

International relations

Twin towns — Sister cities
Iława is twinned with:
 Herborn (Germany)
 Tholen (Netherlands)
 Gargždai (Lithuania)

References

External links

 http://kirkuty.xip.pl/ilawa.htm
 http://www.sztetl.org.pl/pl/article/ilawa/12,cmentarze/19196,cmentarz-przy-ul-biskupskiej/

Cities and towns in Warmian-Masurian Voivodeship
Iława County
Kulm law